Motorsport is a popular sport in the United Kingdom. The United Kingdom is a key player in the world of motorsport, hosting rounds of the Formula One World Championship, World Rally Championship and Grand Prix motorcycle racing, amongst others. It is also the home of many of the current teams in Formula One, such as McLaren, Williams and Aston Martin, while teams such as Red Bull Racing, Mercedes, Alpine and Haas are also based in England. There are also a range of popular national series held such as the British Touring Car Championship. The Motor Sports Association is the official governing body of motorsport in the United Kingdom.

Formula One
The United Kingdom has been a major player in the Formula One World Championship since it began in 1950, providing ten different world champions, winning 19 titles between them, more than any other nation. The country won four consecutive titles between 1962 and 1965, with Graham Hill, Jim Clark (twice) and John Surtees. In 2017 Hamilton became the first Briton to win four titles. He won again in 2018, 2019 and 2020, he became a seven-time champion, equalling Michael Schumacher's record to become the statistically greatest of all time.

Other than the Italian Scuderia Ferrari, the most successful teams in Formula One have been based in Britain. McLaren and Williams are the most successful of these, with former teams Team Lotus and Brabham also winning multiple titles. Of the ten teams currently competing in Formula One, six are based in England.

The British Grand Prix was first held at the Brooklands oval in 1926. The current host is Silverstone Circuit, whereas Brands Hatch last held the race in 1986. The European Grand Prix was held at Brands Hatch in 1983 and 1985, and at Donington Park in 1993. Aintree Motor Racing Circuit has hosted the Formula One British Grand Prix five times, in 1955, 1957, 1959, 1961 and 1962.

IndyCar

Silverstone and Brands Hatch hosted USAC National Championship non-points races in 1978, whereas CART visited Rockingham Motor Speedway in 2001 and 2002, and Brands Hatch in 2003.

Dario Franchitti has won four IndyCar titles. Nigel Mansell won one in CART and Dario Resta won one in the AAA. Franchitti also won three time the Indianapolis 500, Dan Wheldon two, Jim Clark and Graham Hill one each.

Motorcycle racing

Silverstone Circuit currently hosts a round of MotoGP while Donington Park hosts the Superbike World Championship. Britain's Leslie Graham won the inaugural Grand Prix Motorcycling World Championship in 1949. Geoff Duke, John Surtees and Mike Hailwood all won multiple world titles during the 1950s and 1960s. Phil Read was world champion in 1973 and 1974, while Barry Sheene won back-to-back titles in 1976 and 1977. Britain has struggled in the top 500cc/MotoGP class since then, with only Cal Crutchlow winning any races.

Britain has enjoyed greater success in the Superbike World Championship, with Carl Fogarty winning four titles in the 1990s. Neil Hodgson won the title in 2003, while James Toseland won the title in 2004 and 2007. The United Kingdom is currently well represented in the Superbike World Championship.

The British Superbike Championship is the leading motorcycle racing series in the United Kingdom. Road racing events are popular, with the Isle of Man hosting the Isle of Man TT and Northern Ireland hosting the North West 200.

Motocross, motorcycle trials and enduro are also popular forms of motorcycle sports, with notable riders such as Kurt Nicoll, David Thorpe, Jeff Smith, Dave Bickers, David Knight, Sammy Miller, Arthur Lampkin, Martin Lampkin and Dougie Lampkin.

Speedway in the United Kingdom is also popular, with events like the Elite League, Speedway Grand Prix of Great Britain and British Speedway Championship.

In rally raiding, Sam Sunderland became the first British winner of the Dakar Rally when he won the motorcycle classification in 2017.

Drag Racing
Drag Racing has its origins in the USA during the 1920s.  During prohibition the sellers of illegal alcohol, the Moonshine Boys outran the authorities by making their innocuous runabout cars fast and powerful by hiding bigger and more highly tuned engines inside - the Hot Rod was born!  After the end of prohibition the Hot Rodders continued and all over America roads were being used to settle the 'mine is faster than yours argument'.  Most towns had a main road running down the middle and junctions controlled by traffic lights, the Hot Rodders would race down the main drag from one set of lights to the other - the beginning of Drag Racing.

Drag Racing took off in the UK during the 1960s when, like in the USA, many of the old disused airstrips around the country were converted to drag strips.

Podington airfield, near the villages of Hinwick and Podington, was formerly a wartime airbase used by the USAAF during the Second World War.  In 1966 permission was obtained to use the airfield as a drag racing complex, the ¾ of a mile main runway being used as the drag strip.  The track was named Santa Pod after the Santa Ana strip in America, combined with the name of the local village of Podington.

Since then the name Santa Pod Raceway has become synonymous with the sport of Drag Racing in Europe.  Today the raceway hosts events throughout the year including the FIA European Drag Racing Championships and the 'Run What You Brung' (RWYB) events where anyone with a valid driving licence can have a go and put their own vehicles and skills to the test.

Rallying

Rallying is a popular form of motorsport in the United Kingdom. The RAC Rally began in 1932, and has since evolved into Wales Rally GB, the country's round of the World Rally Championship. Colin McRae won the World Rally Championship in 1995, and Richard Burns won in 2001, both for the Banbury-based Subaru World Rally Team. Both were recognised as two of the sport's most famous and popular drivers, but Burns and McRae died in 2005 and 2007 respectively. The Ford World Rally Team was also based in England, as is M-Sport.

The British Rally Championship is the national rally championship of the United Kingdom, featuring events such as the Circuit of Ireland Rally, Scottish Rally and Rally Isle of Man. Smaller championships running annually in the UK include the Scottish Rally Championship, BTRDA rally championship, MSA English Rally Championship and the Northern Irish Rally Championship.

The first rallycross event in history was organised at Lydden Hill Race Circuit in 1967. The circuit has hosted rounds of the European Rallycross Championship and currently the FIA World Rallycross Championship. The British Rallycross Championship also races at Pembrey and Croft.

Touring cars

The British Touring Car Championship is the country's most popular national racing series. Its popularity was highest during the 1990s and the Supertouring era, when it attracted a range of well-known international manufacturers and drivers. Although spiralling costs meant that the series declined during the early 21st century, the series is now regaining popularity.

The United Kingdom also has a presence in the World Touring Car Championship, with Guernsey's Andy Priaulx winning three consecutive world championships between 2005 and 2007. Brands Hatch hosted the UK's WTCC round, the FIA WTCC Race of UK, until 2009. This race is now hosted by Donington Park.

Brands Hatch annually hosted a round of the prestigious German touring car series, DTM, from 2006 to 2013. This series has had a strong representation from UK drivers. The 2005 championship was won by Gary Paffett and the 2010 championship by Scotsman Paul di Resta.

Sportscars

British teams and drivers have enjoyed many successes at the 24 Hours of Le Mans. Britain has had more winning drivers than any other nation, including France. Jaguar and Bentley have taken 15 wins between them. Derek Bell won the race five times during the 1970s and 80s, and Allan McNish three times. Brian Redman and Moss won several World Sportscar Championship races as well.

Vic Elford won the 24 Hours of Daytona, 1000 km Nürburgring and Targa Florio. Andy Wallace won the 24 Hours of Le Mans, 24 Hours of Daytona and 12 Hours of Sebring. Derek Warwick won the FIA World Endurance Championship in 1992 and Anthony Davidson in 2014.

Silverstone currently hosts the 1000 km Silverstone of the FIA World Endurance Championship, as well as rounds of the Le Mans Series and previously the FIA GT1 World Championship.

The British GT Championship is the major national sportscars series, with Britcar and many other smaller championships also running.

Notable British sports car racing teams include Aston Martin Racing, Jaguar Racing, Drayson Racing, Ecurie Ecosse, Richard Lloyd Racing, RML Group, Strakka Racing, Spice Engineering and Tom Walkinshaw Racing.

Junior formulae
The British Formula Three Championship was regarded as one of the most important series below Formula One, with former champions including Nelson Piquet, Mika Häkkinen, Ayrton Senna and Emerson Fittipaldi. Due to the emergence of successful junior formulae in mainland Europe, the series does not attract the quality of drivers it once did, but is still the most important of the national Formula Three series.

In the later 20th century, the British Formula Renault Championship and British Formula Ford Championship were the two main entry level formula series. They were replaced by the F4 British Championship, launched in 2015. The Formula Ford Festival is also known for producing talented young drivers.

Club racing
The United Kingdom has a large 'club racing' scene, with a wide range of series for amateur drivers, with each containing a diverse range of drivers and cars. Clubs include the British Racing and Sports Car Club (BRSCC), British Automobile Racing Club (BARC) and Classic Sports Car Club (CSCC). Each club holds a range of meetings throughout the year, with each meeting consisting of races in several different categories.

Historic racing
Historic racing is popular in the United Kingdom. Major events include the Goodwood Revival, Silverstone Classic, Brands Hatch Masters Historic Festival and Donington Historic Festival. Notable historic racing clubs include the Vintage Sports-Car Club and Historic Sports Car Club.

Circuits
Current venues
Aintree Motor Racing Circuit
Anglesey Circuit
Brands Hatch
Bedford Autodrome
Cadwell Park
Castle Combe Circuit
Croft Circuit
Donington Park
Goodwood Circuit
Knockhill Racing Circuit
Lydden Hill Race Circuit
Mallory Park
Oulton Park
Pembrey Circuit
Silverstone Circuit
Snetterton Motor Racing Circuit
Thruxton Circuit
Santa Pod Raceway

Former venues
Birmingham Superprix
Brooklands
Crystal Palace
Longridge Circuit
Rockingham Motor Speedway
Ibsley Circuit
Llandow Circuit
Ruffoth Circuit

See also

Sport in the United Kingdom
Kart racing in the United Kingdom

References

External links
Motor Sports Association (MSA)